Root Down is an EP by American hip hop group Beastie Boys, released in 1995.

The first three tracks are variations of the track "Root Down", from the Beastie Boys' 1994 album Ill Communication. The remaining seven tracks were recorded "live in Europe, winter 1995". The hidden track heard in the end is a radio jingle in Hebrew made in Israel's military radio station Galey Tzahal. It promoted a Beastie Boys special aired prior to their only two concerts in the country, in March 1995. When Mike D and Ad-Rock were interviewed at the station they heard the recording and asked for it.

Track listing

Charts

"Root Down"

"Root Down" is a song by Beastie Boys from their fourth studio album Ill Communication. The original version of the track, as well as two remixes of the track, are featured on the Root Down EP. It was released as a single in promotion of the Root Down EP; it also served as the fourth single from Ill Communication.

A sample from jazz musician Jimmy Smith's "Root Down (And Get It)", from his seminal album Root Down, serves as the basis for "Root Down". A small vocal sample from "Root Down" was later sampled on The Prodigy's 1997 track "Funky Shit".

Track listing
CD single (U.S.)
 "Root Down" (LP, Clean) – 3:32
 "Root Down" (Free Zone Mix, Clean) – 3:47
 "Root Down" (PP Balloon Mix, Clean) – 3:30

CD single (Netherlands)
 "Root Down" – 3:32

7" single
A. "Root Down" (Clean version) – 3:43
B. "Ricky's Theme" (Clean version) – 3:32

References

External links

1995 EPs
Beastie Boys songs
Live EPs
Beastie Boys EPs
Hardcore punk EPs
Capitol Records EPs